A Dispersal prison is one of five secure prisons in the United Kingdom that houses Category A prisoners. The idea of the Dispersal prison was initiated after a report submitted by Earl Mountbatten in 1966 after some notorious prison escapes. It was decided that special secure units should be built to enable the allocation of Category A prisoners to them, but to also allow the prison authorities the option to 'disperse' a prisoner to one of the other units at short notice. Whilst seven secure units were intended, the actual number has fluctuated over the years with a core selection of five still remaining.

History
During the 1960s in Britain, several notorious and high-profile prisoners escaped from jails across the United Kingdom (Charles Wilson, Ronnie Biggs and George Blake). After the sensational escape of George Blake, a report was commissioned by the government to be chaired by Earl Mountbatten. The report recommended that all prisoners be categorised either A, B, C or D, according to their security risk, escape risk and danger to the general public. Category A prisoners were those deemed to be the worst and Category D prisoners were afforded the right to wander around the prison estate (within reason).

Mountbatten's proposal was for one fortress-style super-prison (called HMP Vectis on the Isle of Wight) where all the prisoners could be housed together in an 'Alcatraz-style' unit; however, following the Radzinowicz Report in 1968, it was decided to build secure units to hold the Category A prisoners at seven locations. In this way, Category A prisoners could be 'dispersed' within any of the seven secure locations and the ability to move them at short notice was retained. The seven secure prisons were preceded by two Special Security Wings at Durham and Leicester prisons, but the two wings were not fit for purpose as they were in pre-existing jails and adapted from existing buildings which were not as secure as a purpose-built prison would be.

In early 2016, it was reported that the UK government was considering using just one unit to house all its Islamist Terrorists as per Mountbatten's original recommendation. Critics pointed out that this would lead to further radicalisation of the non-religious prison community. In 2016, eight high security prisons existed across England and Wales; Belmarsh, Frankland, Full Sutton, Long Lartin, Manchester, Wakefield, Whitemoor and Woodhill. Only five of these are classified as dispersal prisons; Frankland, Full Sutton, Long Lartin, Wakefield and Whitemoor with Belmarsh, Manchester and Woodhill being described as 'Core Local' prisons.

Arguments for and against the Dispersal system have been ongoing since first proposed by Radzinowicz in 1968. The idea of dispersal is that one prison is not overburdened with category A prisoners and the prisoners themselves can be accommodated within a larger prison population. The downside to this is that the system is expensive and that it places additional security on establishments housing Category B prisoners.

The Prisons

Notes

References

Sources

External links
Woodcock enquiry into the 1994 Whitemoor prison escape

Category A prisons in England
 
Penal system in England